"That's My Name" is the title of the platinum selling single  by popular Romanian dance-pop group Akcent. It is one of their most successful hits, topping charts in countries like Romania and Italy. It was produced by Romanian DJ/producer Edward Maya, thus sounding similar to his hit "Stereo Love", notable for its famous accordion hook. In 2009 the song was released as a promotional single in Europe. Akcent promoted the song by performing in a number of events, and  visited countries like India and Pakistan, performing at parties and nightclubs. It was included in the Just Dance: Volume 3 compilation album released by The Island Def Jam Music Group. "That's My Name" had been well received by fans.
Ultra Records in the U.S. released the song as well in 2009-10.

Peak positions

References

External links
Akcent — That's My Name video
Official website

2009 songs
2010 singles
House music songs
Songs written by Edward Maya
Song recordings produced by Edward Maya
Ultra Music singles